St. Elsewhere is an American television medical drama series created by Joshua Brand and John Falsey and produced by MTM Enterprises. The show originally aired in the United States on NBC between October 26, 1982 and May 25, 1988, with 137 episodes split over six seasons. The series follows the day-to-day life of the staff at St. Eligius Hospital, which is nicknamed "St. Elsewhere" for housing the rejects of the more prestigious hospitals.

St. Elsewhere amassed 106 nominations for various industry awards. This includes 62 Emmy awards (with 13 wins), 5 Golden Globe awards, 7 TCA awards (with one win), 4 Q awards (with three wins), 7 Directors Guild of America awards (one win) and 7 Writers Guild of America awards (one win). William Daniels, who portrayed Dr. Mark Craig, received the most awards and nominations, winning two Emmy Awards and two Q awards.

ACE Eddie Awards
Presented since 1962, the Eddie Award is an annual accolade that was created by American Cinema Editors to award outstanding achievements in editing in television and film. St. Elsewhere received three nominations for the award for Best Edited Episode from a Television Series, winning twice for episodes edited by Robert P. Suppey.

Artios Awards
Presented by the Casting Society of America, the Artios Award is an annual accolades honoring outstanding achievements in casting. St. Elsewhere received four nominations during its tenure, winning once in 1986.

Directors Guild of America Awards
The Directors Guild of America Award is an annual accolade presented by the Directors Guild of America (DGA) which awards outstanding achievements in the field of directing. St. Elsewhere received five nominations during its tenure.

Emmy Awards
Presented by the Academy of Television Arts & Sciences since 1949, the Primetime Emmy Award is an annual accolade that honors outstanding achievements in various aspects of television such as acting, directing and writing. St. Elsewhere received 62 nominations, winning thirteen awards. William Daniels and Ed Flanders each received five nominations for Outstanding Lead Actor in a Drama Series, with Daniels winning twice and Flanders winning once. In the supporting actor categories, Doris Roberts and Bonnie Bartlett won for Outstanding Supporting Actress in a Drama Series while James Coco won for Outstanding Supporting Actor in a Drama Series. Ed Begley, Jr. was nominated for Outstanding Supporting Actor in a Drama Series every year the series was broadcasting while Christina Pickles was nominated for Outstanding Supporting Actress in a Drama Series five times. The series won the award for Outstanding Writing for a Drama Series twice in 1984 and 1986 while winning in 1988 for Outstanding Directing for a Drama Series.

The Creative Arts Emmy Award is a branch of the Primetime Emmy Awards that recognizes performances in technical areas in television such as cinematography, costume design, theme music and sound mixing. The series received 12 nominations in the area, winning three awards in 1986 for Outstanding Achievement in Costuming for a Series, Outstanding Art Direction for a Series, and Outstanding Sound Mixing for a Drama Series.

Primetime Emmy Awards

Creative Arts Emmy Awards

Golden Globe Awards

The Golden Globe Award is an annual accolade presented by the Hollywood Foreign Press Association (HFPA) which honors the best performances in television and film. St. Elsewhere was nominated four consecutive times for Best Television Series – Drama while Ed Begley, Jr. was nominated once for Best Supporting Actor – Series, Miniseries or Television Film.

Humanitas Prize
Awarded since 1974, the Humanitas Prize is an annual accolade that recognizes outstanding achievement of writers in film and television whose work promotes human dignity, meaning and freedom. St. Elsewhere received seven nominations for the award in the 60 Minute Category, winning once in 1985.

Peabody Awards
Awarded since 1940, the Peabody Award, named after American banker and philanthropist George Peabody, is an annual award the recognizes excellence in storytelling across mediums including television, radio, television networks, and online videos. St. Elsewhere won the award for the year of 1984, with the award committee praising it as "distinguished television, set apart from other dramatic series by its depth of characterization, crisp and believable dialogue, and unusual variety in lighting, staging and photography."

People's Choice Awards
The People's Choice Awards are an annual awards show, presented since 1975, which recognize the people and work of popular culture. St. Elsewhere won the award for Favorite New TV Dramatic Program in 1983.

Television Critics Association Awards
Awarded by Television Critics Association since 1985, the Television Critics Association Award (TCA Award) is an annual accolade that recognizes outstanding achievements in television programming and acting performances. St. Elsewhere has received seven nominations—four for Outstanding Achievement in Drama and three for Program of the Year. The series won in 1988 for Outstanding Achievement in Drama.

Viewers for Quality Television Awards

The Q Award, presented by the Viewers for Quality Television since 1986, recognizes critically acclaimed programs and performers for their outstanding achievements in television. St. Elsewhere received four nominations, winning three awards—two for Best Actor in a Quality Drama Series, awarded to William Daniels, and one for Best Supporting Actress in a Quality Drama Series, awarded to Bonnie Bartlett.

Writers Guild of America Awards
Presented by the Writers Guild of America (WGA), the Writers Guild of America Award is an annual accolade that recognizes outstanding achievement of writers in film, television, radio, promotional writing and videogames. St. Elsewhere received seven nominations for Television: Episodic Drama, winning once in 1986.

References

External links
 List of Primetime Emmy Awards received by St. Elsewhere
 List of awards and nominations received by St. Elsewhere at the Internet Movie Database

St Elsewhere